The Old Siam Plaza is a shopping mall in Wang Burapha, a historic neighbourhood of Bangkok, Thailand. It is surrounded by Tri Phet, Burapha, Phahurat and parts of Charoen Krung roads, and is near other neighbourhoods such as Yaowarat, Pak Khlong Talat or Ban Mo.

History

The mall is on the site of the former Burapha Phirom Palace, which belonged to Prince Bhanurangsi Savangwongse, one of the brothers of King Rama V. After World War II, the palace was sold and became a shopping center which was popular with young people in the 1950s and 1960s.

The Old Siam Plaza was opened in 1993. The building is in a Colonial mixed architectural style.

See also
List of shopping malls in Bangkok

References

External links

Shopping malls in Thailand
Shopping malls in Bangkok
Shopping malls established in 1993
1993 establishments in Thailand
Phra Nakhon district
Buildings and structures in Bangkok